Lydia Forson (born 24 October 1984) is a Ghanaian actress, writer, and producer. In 2010 she won the African Movie Academy Award for Best Actress in a Leading Role.

Early life and education
Forson was born on 24 October 1984 in Mankessim, Ghana. She received her early education at Wilmore Elementary School in Kentucky. At the age of nine, her family moved to Ghana, where she continued her education at Akosombo International School. She also attended St. Louis Secondary School, Kumasi, where she completed her secondary school education.

Forson graduated from the University of Ghana, earning a bachelor's degree in English Language and Information Studies.

Career
Forson's acting career started with a cameo role in Hotel St. James (2005), Run Baby Run (2006), Different Shades of Blue (2007) and a stint in the reality show The Next Movie Star in Nigeria (2007). Shirley Frimpong-Manso, CEO of Sparrow Productions, who had previously worked with her in the Ghanaian television series Different Shades of Blue, brought Forson back to the screens through the movie Scorned. This starring role led to her first African Movie Academy Awards (AMAA) nomination as the Best Upcoming Female Actress.

In 2009, Forson starred in the award-winning The Perfect Picture by Shirley Frimpong-Manso. She has starred in A Sting in a Tale, Phone Swap, Masquerades, Keteke, and Sidechic Gang.

Filmography

Hotel St. James (2005) – Cameo roles
Run Baby Run (2006) – Supporting role
Different Shades of Blue (2007)
The Next Movie Star Reality Show (2007) – Third runner-up
Scorned (2008) – Lead role
The Perfect Picture (2009) – Supporting role
A Sting in a Tale (2009) – Lead role
Masquerades (2011)
Phone Swap (2012)
Kamara's Tree (2013)
Scandal (2013) (South African series) – Aku
 A Letter From Adam (2014) – Writer/Producer
Isoken (2017)
Keteke (2017) - Leading role 
Sidechic Gang (2018)
Borga (2021)

Awards

References 

1984 births
Ghanaian film actresses
Ghanaian film producers
Ghanaian women film producers
Best Actress Africa Movie Academy Award winners
Living people
University of Ghana alumni
People from Central Region (Ghana)
21st-century Ghanaian actresses